Hult is the Swedish spelling variant of holt and may refer to:

Education
Hult International Business School, a global business school with locations in Boston, San Francisco, London, Dubai, Shanghai,& New York
Hult Ashridge Executive Education, Hult Intl. Business School's executive education program
Hult Prize, the world's largest student competition for social good, founded by Bertil Hult and hosted by the Hult Intl. Business School

Organizations
Hult Center for the Performing Arts, Oregon
Hult Healey, a maker of automotive kits

Surname
Hult (surname)

Places 
Hult, Sweden, a village in Eksjö Municipality

See also

 
 Holt (disambiguation)
 Holte